Parliamentary elections were held in Czechoslovakia on 26 May 1946. The Communist Party of Czechoslovakia emerged as the largest party, winning 114 of the 300 seats (93 for the main party and 21 for its Slovak branch) with 38% of the vote. The Communist vote share was higher than any party had ever achieved in a Czechoslovak parliamentary election; previously, no party had ever won more than 25%. Voter turnout was 94%. The national results also determined the composition of the Slovak National Council and local committees.

This was one of only two free nationwide elections held in the Eastern Bloc, the other having been held in Hungary a year earlier. Two years later, the Communists staged a coup d'etat and established the Czechoslovak Republic. As a result, the 1946 election was the last free and fair election held in Czechoslovakia until 1990.

Background
After World War II, a 300-member Interim National Assembly was formed and met for the first time on 28 October 1945. The Assembly created a new electoral system with the country divided into 28 multi-member constituencies. 150 members were elected from Bohemia, 81 from Moravia and Silesia and 69 from Slovakia. The voting age was lowered to 18, but only Czechs, Slovaks and other Slavs could register to vote.

Opinion polls

Results

Bohemia, Moravia and Silesia

Slovakia

Aftermath
Following the elections, Communist leader Klement Gottwald formed a coalition government. However, the Communists gradually tightened their grip on the country. After the non-Communist members resigned from the Cabinet on 25 February 1948, the Communists seized full control of the country.

See also
1946 Slovak parliamentary election

References

Czechoslovakia
Parliamentary election
Legislative elections in Czechoslovakia
Czechoslovakia